Foo Chee Hock PBS SC is, as of 2022, the Dean of the Singapore Judicial College.

Education 

Foo graduated from St Joseph's Institution in 1976, the National University of Singapore in 1984 and a Masters of Laws from Cambridge University in 1989.

Legal career 

Foo joined the Singapore Legal Service in 1984 and served in a variety of legal and judicial posts during that time, including as a Magistrate and District Judge in the then-Subordinate Courts, and as an Assistant Registrar and Deputy Registrar in the Supreme Court of Singapore. In 2009, he was appointed Registrar of the Supreme Court. In his time as Registrar, Foo assisted the Courts with the implementation of the “docket system” of case management and end-to-end e-Litigation systems and also was the “driving force that helped to demystify the judiciary and (make) the courts more accessible to the general public”.

Foo was subsequently appointed as a Judicial Commissioner by President Tony Tan in April 2015.  He served a three-year term during which time he also oversaw the development of the Singapore Judicial College. Upon his appointment as a Judicial Commissioner, he was replaced as the Registrar of the Supreme Court by Vincent Hoong.

At the conclusion of his term as Judicial Commissioner in 2019, Foo assumed full-time leadership of the Singapore Judicial College. He was also, during his time as Judicial Commissioner, Editor-in-Chief of Singapore Civil Procedure and had also been a member of the Rules Committee and the Rules of Court Working Party. He is also a senior mediator at the Singapore Mediation Centre.

On 9 January 2023, during his Opening of the Legal Year address, the Honourable the Chief Justice Sundaresh Menon announced that Foo will be retiring in April 2023 and that the Singapore Judicial College would be searching for a new Dean.

Awards 

Foo received the Long Service Award in 2007. He was also appointed Senior Counsel (Honoris Causa) in 2019 in recognition of his “special knowledge in law and contributions to the development of the law and legal profession”.

References 

Year of birth missing (living people)
Living people
National University of Singapore alumni
Alumni of the University of Cambridge